is a Japanese swimmer. He won a bronze medal in the men's 4 × 100 metre medley relay at the 2008 Summer Olympics.

Personal bests 
In long course:
 50m freestyle: 22.63 (September 5, 2008)
 100m freestyle: 48.91 (September 9, 2007)
 200m freestyle: 1:48.77 (September 9, 2007)

External links
 Athlete bio at 2008 Olympics site
 Profile - JOC

1987 births
Living people
Japanese male freestyle swimmers
Olympic swimmers of Japan
Swimmers at the 2008 Summer Olympics
Olympic bronze medalists for Japan
Nihon University alumni
Olympic bronze medalists in swimming
Medalists at the 2008 Summer Olympics
Universiade medalists in swimming
Universiade silver medalists for Japan
Universiade bronze medalists for Japan
Medalists at the 2005 Summer Universiade
21st-century Japanese people